Lanthanum cobaltite is a perovskite with chemical formula LaCoO3. As a solid, the structure LaCoO3, will exist as rhombohedral material at room temperature with ferroelastic properties; though at temperatures above ~900 °C a phase transition to a cubic lattice occurs.

It is also common of LaCoO3 to be utilized with either dopants or exhibit oxygen non-stoichometry where it may assume the structure La1−xA'xCo1−yB'yO3±𝛿 where  𝛿 is some small quantity making this class of perovskites extremely versatile for catalysis, one such commonly utilized material is lanthanum strontium cobalt ferrite otherwise known as LSCF.

References

Lanthanum compounds
Cobalt(III) compounds
Perovskites
Oxides